Jizabad-e Shahan Garmab (also Romanized as Jīzābād-e Shāhān Garmāb; also known as Jīzābād and Kheyrābād) is a village in Abravan Rural District, Razaviyeh District, Mashhad County, Razavi Khorasan Province, Iran. At the 2006 census, its population was 221, in 44 families.

References 

Populated places in Mashhad County